Charles Fane de Salis  (1860–1942) was Bishop of Taunton from 1911 to 1930.

Early life

Born in Fringford, Oxfordshire, on 18 or 19 March 1860 into an occasionally clerical family, he was educated at Eton and Exeter College, Oxford (MA, DD).

Ministry
Made deacon in 1883 and ordained priest in 1884, he was Curate at St. Michael's, Coventry (until 1888), Vicar of Milverton (1888–1896), then East Brent (1896–99, succeeding his uncle George Denision) and then Rector of Weston-super-Mare. In 1911, he became Archdeacon of Taunton (by his collation on 18 May) and Bishop suffragan of Taunton immediately before his consecration as a bishop on St James's Day (25 July), by Randall Davidson, Archbishop of Canterbury, at St Paul's Cathedral. He additionally became a canon residentiary of Wells Cathedral in 1915, resigned his see and canonry in 1930, and became an assistant bishop of Bath and Wells in 1931. He retired as archdeacon in 1938.

He died on 24 January 1942 and is commemorated in a memorial on the west wall of Wells Cathedral.

Marriage and family
De Salis married his third cousin, on 21 July 1896, Lady Mary Alice (28 June 186311 January 1930, daughter of Thomas Parker, 6th Earl of Macclesfield). They had two daughters and a son.

References

1860 births
1942 deaths
People educated at Eton College
Alumni of Exeter College, Oxford
Archdeacons of Taunton
Bishops of Taunton
Charles
Charles